Illano (Eonavian: Eilao) is a municipality in the Principality of Asturias Spanish autonomous community. It is bordered on the north by Boal, on the south by San Martín de Oscos, on the east by Boal,  Villayón and Allande, and on the west by Villanueva de Oscos and Castropol.

Parishes
Bullaso
Gío
Herías
Illano
Ronda

References

External links
Federación Asturiana de Concejos 
Guia del Occidente. Illano 

Municipalities in Asturias